The R231 road is a regional road in Ireland. It is a loop road from the N15 road in County Donegal. Most of the road is part of the Wild Atlantic Way.

The R231 heads west from the N15, just outside Ballyshannon. The road goes northwest before turning northeast towards the beach village of Rossnowlagh and passing Durnesh Lough. The road rejoins the N15 at Ballintra.

See also
Roads in Ireland

References

Regional roads in the Republic of Ireland
Roads in County Donegal